The Helio AU-24 Stallion was an American armed gunship, counter-insurgency, and utility transport developed for the United States Air Force. A total of 20 were built during the Vietnam War, with most of the aircraft being later sold to the Khmer Air Force.

Design and development
The Helio HST-550 Stallion was an STOL utility aircraft developed in the United States in 1963, with the first prototype flying in July 1964. Initially conceived by the Helio Aircraft Company as a turboprop-powered variant of the Helio Courier, it eventually emerged as a completely new design of the same general configuration and much of its design was initiated from components used in the Helio H-500 Twin. It was a much larger aircraft than the Courier, and Helio soon discovered that it was too expensive for the market.

The United States Air Force (USAF) however, emerged as a buyer for the design, purchasing the aircraft for the Credible Chase programme as the AU-24A. This was the gunship version of the Stallion, with a PT6A-27  turboprop, equipped with an M197 three-barrel 20x102mm rotary cannon mounted in the left cargo door. It also had five underwing and fuselage hardpoints.

Of the 18 aircraft purchased by the USAF, fourteen or fifteen were eventually delivered to the Khmer Air Force (KAF) between January and November 1972 under the Foreign Military Sales program for use in border surveillance and counter-infiltration roles, where the threat of encountering anti-aircraft fire (other than small arms) was minimal.

Operational history

Cambodia
An important addition to the KAF, the AU-24A mini-gunships were assigned to a newly raised Mini-gunship Squadron (French: Escadron AU-24) stationed at Pochentong Air Base near Phnom Penh, which broadened supply convoy escort operations on the lower Mekong-Bassac Rivers corridors.  Such operations had been carried out in conjunction with the Khmer National Navy (MNK) since mid-1971, when the KAF began to provide air cover to MNK convoys with their Douglas AC-47D Spooky gunships.

Under Project Flycatcher, an improvement programme for the KAF, the Americans delivered among other aircraft types a single AU-24A mini-gunship before the programme was officially terminated on June 30, 1973. Although the AU-24A mini-gunships delivered to Cambodia acquainted themselves well in the river convoy escort role, they were found to be beset with a long list of technical faults, which became painfully clear on August 10, 1973, after a Stallion crashed on a rocket pass, killing its crew and forced the KAF Air Command to temporarily ground the entire mini-gunship fleet.

In the final months of the Cambodian Civil War, the KAF employed their AU-24A mini-gunships in night bombing operations against entrenched Khmer Rouge 107mm rocket positions north of Phnom Penh, but after virtually expended their entire ordnance reserves, three Stallions escaped on April 16–17, 1975 from Pochentong Air Base flown by their respective crews to safe haven in neighbouring Thailand. The Khmer Rouge did managed though to salvage intact nine AU-24A mini-gunships for the Air Force of the Kampuchea Liberation Army (AFKLA) of the new Democratic Kampuchea Regime, although poor maintenance and a chronic shortage of spare parts ensured that only one of these machines was still airworthy when the AFKLA was neutralized by the People's Army of Vietnam in February 1979 during the Cambodian–Vietnamese War. This remaining Stallion was subsequently taken after 1979 into service of the air force component of the Kampuchean People's Revolutionary Armed Forces (KPRAF; later, CPAF), remaining operational until 1993, when was finally decommissioned.

Variants
 H-550 – prototypes (2 built)
 AU-24A Stallion (H-550A) – production version (18 built)
 H-634 Twin Stallion – version with twin Allison 250 turboprops mounted on a beam across the nose of the aircraft (not built)
 H-1201T Twin Stallion – version with twin engines in underwing nacelles, retractable undercarriage, tiptanks, and underwing cargo pods (not built)

Operators

 Colombian Air Force. A single aircraft seized for drugs and used as liaison.

 Khmer Air Force

 United States Air Force

Specifications (H-550A)

See also

References

Notes

Bibliography
 

 
 
Kenneth Conboy, FANK: A History of the Cambodian Armed Forces, 1970-1975, Equinox Publishing (Asia) Pte Ltd, Djakarta 2011. 
Kenneth Conboy, Kenneth Bowra, and Mike Chappell, The War in Cambodia 1970-75, Men-at-arms series 209, Osprey Publishing Ltd, London 1989. 
Larry Davis and Don Greer, Gunships, A Pictorial History of Spooky – Specials series (6032), Carrollton, TX: Squadron/Signal Publications, 1982. 
Joe F. Leeker, Khmer Air Force AU-24As, University of Texas at Dallas 2006–2015. –

External links

Helio AU-24 Stallion at globalsecurity.org
Helio AU-24 Stallion at helioaircraft.com
Khmer Air Force official site

1960s United States civil utility aircraft
Stallion
1960s United States attack aircraft
Single-engined turboprop aircraft
Single-engined tractor aircraft
Shoulder-wing aircraft
Aircraft first flown in 1964